1958 Egypt Cup Final, was the final match of 1957–58 Egypt Cup, between Zamalek & Al-Ahly, with the game ending 0–0 meant the two sides could not be separated, so a replay was played four days later, the replay game ends 2–2, title shared between the two clubs for the 2nd time (after 1943).

Route to the final

Game description

Match details

Replay

References 
 http://www.angelfire.com/ak/EgyptianSports/ZamVsAhlyCUP1958.html#9/5/58

1958
EC 1958
Al Ahly SC matches